Anders Ekström (born 16 January 1981) is a Swedish sailor who has participated in two Summer Olympics.  He and Fredrik Lööf sailed together in the Star class, winning the Star world championship, the Star European championship, finishing 14th at Athens in 2004, and winning the bronze medal at Beijing in 2008.

Achievements

References

External links
Athlete bio at 2008 Olympics site

1981 births
Olympic sailors of Sweden
Swedish male sailors (sport)
Olympic bronze medalists for Sweden
Sailors at the 2004 Summer Olympics – Star
Sailors at the 2008 Summer Olympics – Star
Living people
Olympic medalists in sailing
Star class world champions
Medalists at the 2008 Summer Olympics
World champions in sailing for Sweden
20th-century Swedish people
21st-century Swedish people